John Glyn-Jones (28 August 1908 – 21 January 1997) was a British stage, radio, television and film actor.

His father, William Glyn-Jones, was a Member of Parliament and he was educated at Bishop's Stortford College and Oxford University. He began his acting career in repertory theatre in Oxford and with the BBC Drama Repertory Company, with whom he played Organ Morgan in the original recording of Under Milk Wood in 1954. As well as acting he was also a producer and director for the BBC, during 1947–1951.

On television he appeared in a 1966 episode of The Avengers entitled "A Sense of History" as the archivist Grindley (ending up deceased with an arrow in his back on a classroom floor).

Selected filmography

 Save a Little Sunshine (1938) - Impressionist (uncredited)
 Inspector Hornleigh (1939) - Alfred (uncredited)
 They Came by Night (1940) - Llewellyn Jones
 The Proud Valley (1940) - Mr. Howes - Collector (uncredited)
 Convoy (1940) - Mate
 Sailors Three (1940) - Best Man
 Vice Versa (1948) - Bindabun Doss
 The Long Memory (1952) - Gedge
 Valley of Song (1953) - Ebenezer Davies 
 The Final Test (1953) - Mr. Willis
 The Heart of the Matter (1953) - Harris (uncredited)
 A Day to Remember (1953) - Mr. Mitchell (uncredited)
 The Love Lottery (1954) - Prince Boris
 Carrington V.C. (1954) - Reporter - Evans
 Value for Money (1955) - Arkwright
 The Truth About Women (1957) - Raven
 Heart of a Child (1958) - Priest
 The Adventures of Hal 5 (1958) - Mr. Goorlie
 Carlton-Browne of the F.O. (1959) - Newsreel Interviewer
 Web of Evidence (1959) - Magistrate
 I'm All Right Jack (1959) - Detto Executive
 Two-Way Stretch (1960) - Lawyer
 Man in the Moon (1960) - Dr. Wilmot
 The Sinister Man (1961) - Dr. Maurice Tarn
 Locker Sixty-Nine (1962) - Insp. Roon
 Go to Blazes (1962) - Fire Chief
 Waltz of the Toreadors (1962) - Jenkins the Innkeeper
 Heavens Above! (1963) - Professor (uncredited)
 The Yellow Teddy Bears (1963) - Benny Wintle
 Smokescreen (1964) - Player
 The Verdict (1964) - Harry
 Decline and Fall... of a Birdwatcher (1968) - Warden
 Nobody Ordered Love (1972) - Harry
 Dark Places (1973) - Bank Manager
 The Copter Kids (1976) - Mr. Davidson (final film role)

References

External links

1908 births
1997 deaths
Male actors from London
English male stage actors
English male film actors
English male television actors
English radio actors
People educated at Bishop's Stortford College
20th-century English male actors